Carceliella is a genus of flies in the family Tachinidae.

Species
C. octava (Baranov, 1931)

References

Diptera of Asia
Exoristinae
Tachinidae genera